Hanna von Hoerner (14 November 1942 – 4 July 2014) was a German astrophysicist. She founded the company von Hoerner & Sulger which produces scientific instruments, notably cosmic dust analyzers used on space missions by the European Space Agency (ESA) and NASA.

Early life 
Hanna von Hoerner was born in Görlitz in 1942. Her father was the astrophysicist Sebastian von Hoerner. With his help and encouragement, she repaired radios when she was six and built an oscilloscope at the age of fourteen.

In the early 1960s, after she had graduated from her secondary school, her father moved to the National Radio Astronomy Observatory (NRAO) in the US. Von Hoerner completed an electronics education in the United States and worked as a research assistant at the National Radio Astronomy Observatory.

Education 
In 1965, von Hoerner returned to Germany to study experimental physics at Heidelberg University.  In 1971 she earned an undergraduate degree and in 1974 her PhD, both at Heidelberg University.

Career 

Von Hoerner, in 1973 while still working on her PhD, founded the company von Hoerner & Sulger.  Based in Schwetzingen and produces scientific instruments for use in space and medicine.In 1980 von Hoerner & Sulger developed the first mass spectrometer that worked in space In 1979 van Hoerner's company was commissioned by the Max Planck Institute for Solar System Research to design a cosmic dust detector for use in the Vega program missions to Venus. In 1999 Von Hoerner & Sulger designed CIDA (Cometary and Interstellar Dust Analyzer), a dust analysis instrument on board the NASA spacecraft Stardust, which launched in 1999.  The company is famous for the design of COSIMA (Cometary Secondary Ion Mass Analyser), an instrument on board the Rosetta spacecraft that analyses the composition of dust particles using secondary ion mass spectrometry. Early data included images of dust particles collected in the environment of Comet 67P/C-G from the nucleus approach phase until along with secondary ion mass spectra for some of those particles.

Reflections on Hanna von Hoener 
The interstellar dust collector is one of the prime examples of space measuring instruments with which the Baden-based small company Hoerner & Sulger (vH & S) has made a name for itself. With just 20 employees and a turnover of 7.7 million euros last year, according to managing director Hanna von Hoerner,  Veronika Szentpetery, in Technology Review 1997

Awards and recognition 
 2009 Von Hoerner was awarded the Order of Merit of Baden-Württemberg
 2013 Order of Merit of the Federal Republic of Germany First Class for her contributions to space science in Germany.
2016 A comet was named after her.
 Member of the Space Forum in the BDLI ( Bundesverband der Deutschen Luft- und Raumfahrtindustrie /  German Aerospace Industries Association)
 Board of Trustees of the Max Planck Institute for Solar System Research
 DLR Space Program Committee.

Publications 
COSIMA: High Resolution Time-of-Flight Secondary Mass Spectrometer for the Analysis of Cometary Dust Particles Onboard ROSETTA.

COSIMA Cometary Dust Analysis in the inner coma of Comet 67P/Churyumov-Gerasimenko  authors: Hilchenbach, Martin; Kissel, Jochen; Briois, Christelle; von Hoerner, Hanna; November 2014 AAS Division for Planetary Sciences Meeting Abstracts

Search for satellites near comet 67P/Churyumov-Gerasimenko using Rosetta/OSIRIS images   Astronomy & Astrophysics. vol.583: A19. 10.1051/0004-6361/201525979

Notes

German astrophysicists
1942 births
2014 deaths
German women physicists
People from Görlitz
Heidelberg University alumni
20th-century German  physicists
21st-century German physicists
20th-century  German women scientists
21st-century  German  women scientists
Officers Crosses of the Order of Merit of the Federal Republic of Germany
Recipients of the Order of Merit of Baden-Württemberg